Ciske de Rat is a 1984 Dutch drama film based on the novel by Piet Bakker. Ciske is played by 13-year-old Danny de Munk who also sang the title song Ik voel me zo verdomd alleen ("I feel so damned alone") which scored a number one hit in the Netherlands. In 1985 the film won a UNICEF Award at the Berlin International Film Festival. With more than 1.5 million admissions it was one of the most successful Dutch films of all time although did not surpass the 1955 version. Two years later, an extended version of the film was turned into a four-episode TV series.

Storyline
Ciske, nicknamed the rat, grows up in 1930s Amsterdam as a street-kid in need of parental love. Because his seaman father Cor is largely absent, he is forced to live with his mother Marie who abuses him. Ciske has been expelled from a few schools till he joins Master Bruis' class; Bruis manages to win Ciske's trust and make him feel at ease. Meanwhile, Cor begins a relationship with laundry lady Aunt Jans, fuelling Ciske's hope of a better future than at home with his mother. Marie refuses to cooperate in a divorce, not to mention Bruis' application for guardianship. Instead she chooses to destroy a present (a copy of Gulliver's Travels) that Ciske got from his one friend Dorus who was terminally ill. Ciske retaliates by grabbing a knife and stabbing his mother to death. Ciske is sentenced to detention, struggling to survive among elder inmates. Upon his release, everyone has gone off him; even Aunt Jans, by cancelling her wedding because she does not want to build a future on someone else's loss. All ends well when Ciske saves a bullying classmate from drowning; he is welcomed back at school. Cor and Aunt Jans make amends, and decide to marry after all.

Cast
 Danny de Munk - Ciske Vrijmoeth / Ciske de Rat
 Willeke van Ammelrooy - Mother Marie
 Herman van Veen - Master Bruis
 Willem Nijholt - Uncle Henri
 Peter Faber - Father Cor
 Rijk de Gooyer - Detective Muyskens
 Carolien van den Berg - Aunt Chris 
 Linda van Dyck - Aunt Jans

See also
 Ciske de Rat (original novel and musical)
 Ciske de Rat (1955 film)

References

External links 

1984 drama films
1984 films
Dutch children's films
Dutch comedy films
Films based on Dutch novels
Films set in Amsterdam
Films shot in Amsterdam
Films set in the 1930s
1980s Dutch-language films
Films directed by Guido Pieters